Dinner Music is an album by American composer, bandleader and keyboardist Carla Bley recorded in 1976 and released on the Watt/ECM label in 1977.

Reception
The Allmusic review by Michael G. Nastos awarded the album 4½ stars and stated "First excursion on a funky trail, executed immaculately. Near essential". The Penguin Guide to Jazz awarded the album 3 stars.

Track listing
All compositions by Carla Bley except where noted.
 "Sing Me Softly of the Blues" - 7:43  
 "Dreams So Real" - 5:36  
 "Ad Infinitum" - 5:54  
 "Dining Alone" (lyrics by Bley & John Hunt) - 4:36  
 "Song Sung Long" - 6:02  
 "Ida Lupino" - 7:57  
 "Funnybird Song" - 3:05  
 "A New Hymn" - 7:25

Personnel
Carla Bley - organ, piano, tenor saxophone, vocals
Michael Mantler - trumpet  
Carlos Ward - alto saxophone, tenor saxophone, flute  
Roswell Rudd - trombone  
Bob Stewart - tuba  
Richard Tee - piano, electric piano 
Cornell Dupree (tracks 1 & 7), Eric Gale, (tracks 2, 4 & 6) - guitar 
Gordon Edwards - bass guitar  
Steve Gadd - drums

References

ECM Records albums
Carla Bley albums
1977 albums